Physoplatys is a genus of spiders in the family Thomisidae. It was first described in 1895 by Simon. , it contains only one species, Physoplatys nitidus, found in Paraguay.

References

Thomisidae
Monotypic Araneomorphae genera
Spiders of South America